Bangladeshi hip hop is commonly a genre of music and culture that covers a variety of styles of hip hop music developed in Bangladesh. It is heavily influenced by American hip hop, and started in late 1990. In recent years, Bangladeshi hip hop artists have begun to emerge in underground scenes in large cities such as Dhaka, Khulna, Comilla, Sylhet,Mymensingh and Chittagong. The lyrical expression of cultural identity, with lyrics addressing Bangladesh's political and social problems, make this genre a popular and growing one.

History
In Early 1993, Ashraf babu and Charu first introduced rap music in the Bengali-language music industry. They released an album called Tri-Rotner Khepa, which was the first Bengali rap music album.

Notable groups

Stoic Bliss 

In 2004, Queens based Bangladeshi hiphop group Stoic Bliss was formed.
They first introduced Banglish (Bangla-English) rap fusion in Bangla rap. Stoic Bliss was the very first to introduce hip-hop to Bangladesh through blogs before social media existed quickly gaining popularity in the underground music scene in Bangladesh. Their debut album "Lights Years Ahead" , was released in Bangladesh under the G-Series banner in June 2006. The single "Abar Jigay" from their first album raised the group's popularity among the Bengali community. The Light Years Ahead album sold well over 250,000 copies within the first 10 months, making Stoic Bliss an emerging mainstream music group in Bangladesh.

Deshi MCs 
Dhaka based crew Deshi MCs was formed in 2006. Mc Shaq, Xplosive and Skibkhan were the founding members. Later another member MC Mugz joined the group. They first introduced gangsta rap in Bangla rap scene. In 2006, they released their first studio album named "Banned". They known as the pioneers of "Banglish Gangsta Rap".

Theology Of Rap (T.O.R) 
T.O.R was formed in 2006 by Adi and Shib-b. In 2009, they released their first album "Hip Hop Jaati",which brought them success.

Uptown Lokolz 
Another crew from Dhaka City named "Uptown Lokolz" was formed in 2008. In the same year, they released their first album -"Kahini Scene Paat [Explicit]".The single "Ai Mama Ai" from their first album gone viral nationwide.

Jalali Set 
Crew featuring MC Mugz, Double S, Shadhu & Jalali Shafayat.

See also
Apeiruss
Fuad al Muqtadir

References

20th-century music genres
21st-century music genres
Bangladeshi hip hop
Bangladeshi music
Bangladeshi styles of music